North East Scotland is one of the eight electoral regions of the Scottish Parliament which were created in 1999. Ten of the parliament's 73 first past the post constituencies are sub-divisions of the region and it elects seven of the 56 additional-member Members of the Scottish Parliament (MSPs). Thus it elects a total of 17 MSPs.

The North East Scotland region shares boundaries with the Highlands and Islands and Mid Scotland and Fife regions.

Constituencies and local government areas

Since 2011 

As a result of the  First Periodic Review of Scottish Parliament Boundaries the boundaries of the region and constituencies were redrawn for the 2011 Scottish Parliament election.

1999–2011 
In terms of first past the post constituencies the region covered:

The constituencies were created in 1999 with the names and boundaries of Westminster constituencies, as existing in at that time. Scottish Westminster constituencies were mostly replaced with new constituencies in 2005

In terms of local government areas the region covers:

 Aberdeenshire
 Aberdeen City
 the City of Dundee 
 part of Angus (otherwise within the Mid Scotland and Fife electoral region)
 a small part of Moray (otherwise within the Highlands and Islands electoral region) 
 a small part of Perth and Kinross (otherwise within the Mid Scotland and Fife electoral region)

Members of the Scottish Parliament

Constituency MSPs

Regional list MSPs
N.B. This table is for presentation purposes only

Election results

2021 Scottish Parliament election

Constituency results

|-
! colspan=2 style="width: 200px"|Constituency
! style="width: 150px"|Elected member
! style="width: 300px"|Result

Additional member results

2016 Scottish Parliament election

In the 2016 Scottish Parliament election the region elected MSPs as follows:
 9 Scottish National Party MSPs (nine constituency members)
 5 Conservative MSPs (one constituency member, four additional members)
 2 Labour MSPs (all additional members)
 1 Liberal Democrat MSP (additional member)

Constituency results 
{| class=wikitable
!colspan=4 style=background-color:#f2f2f2|2016 Scottish Parliament election: North East Scotland
|-
! colspan=2 style="width: 200px"|Constituency
! style="width: 150px"|Elected member
! style="width: 300px"|Result

Additional member results
Candidates elected on the regional list are shown in bold; candidates elected in a constituency who also stood on a list are shown in italics.

2011 Scottish Parliament election

In the 2011 Scottish Parliament election the region elected MSPs as follows:
 11 Scottish National Party MSPs (ten constituency members and one additional members)
 3 Labour MSPs (all additional members)
 2 Conservative MSPs (all additional members)
 1 Liberal Democrat MSP (additional member)

Constituency results 
{| class=wikitable
!colspan=4 style=background-color:#f2f2f2|2011 Scottish Parliament election: North East Scotland
|-
! colspan=2 style="width: 200px"|Constituency
! style="width: 150px"|Elected member
! style="width: 300px"|Result

Additional member results
{| class=wikitable
!colspan=8 style=background-color:#f2f2f2|2011 Scottish Parliament election: North East Scotland
|-
! colspan="2" style="width: 150px"|Party
! Elected candidates
! style="width: 40px"|Seats
! style="width: 40px"|+/−
! style="width: 50px"|Votes
! style="width: 40px"|%
! style="width: 40px"|+/−%
|-

2007 Scottish Parliament election
In the 2007 Scottish Parliament election the region elected MSPs as follows:
 8 Scottish National Party MSPs (six constituency members and two additional members)
 3 Labour MSPs (one constituency members and two additional members)
 3 Liberal Democrat MSPs (two constituency members and one additional member)
 2 Conservative MSPs (all additional members)

Constituency results 
{| class=wikitable
!colspan=4 style=background-color:#f2f2f2|2007 Scottish Parliament election: North East Scotland
|-
! colspan=2 style="width: 200px"|Constituency
! style="width: 150px"|Elected member
! style="width: 300px"|Result

Additional member results
{| class=wikitable
!colspan=8 style=background-color:#f2f2f2|2007 Scottish Parliament election: North East Scotland
|-
! colspan="2" style="width: 150px"|Party
! Elected candidates
! style="width: 40px"|Seats
! style="width: 40px"|+/−
! style="width: 50px"|Votes
! style="width: 40px"|%
! style="width: 40px"|+/−%
|-

2003 Scottish Parliament election
In the 2003 Scottish Parliament election the region elected MSPs as follows:

 5 Scottish National Party MSPs (four constituency members and one additional member)
 4 Labour MSPs (two constituency members and two additional members)
 3 Liberal Democrat MSPs (all constituency members)
 3 Conservative MSPs (all additional members)
 1 Green MSP (additional member)

Constituency results 
{| class=wikitable
!colspan=4 style=background-color:#f2f2f2|2003 Scottish Parliament election: North East Scotland
|-
! colspan=2 style="width: 200px"|Constituency
! style="width: 150px"|Elected member
! style="width: 300px"|Result

Additional member results
{| class=wikitable
!colspan=8 style=background-color:#f2f2f2|2003 Scottish Parliament election: North East Scotland
|-
! colspan="2" style="width: 150px"|Party
! Elected candidates
! style="width: 40px"|Seats
! style="width: 40px"|+/−
! style="width: 50px"|Votes
! style="width: 40px"|%
! style="width: 40px"|+/−%
|-
 
 
 
 
 
 
 
 
 
  
  
 

Changes:
 Maureen Watt replaced Richard Lochhead, who resigned as an MSP in April 2006 to contest the Moray by-election following the death of Margaret Ewing. Watt was the next available candidate on the SNP list.

1999 Scottish Parliament election
In the 1999 Scottish Parliament election the region elected MSPs as follows:

 6 Scottish National Party MSPs (two constituency members four additional members)
 4 Labour MSPs (all constituency members)
 3 Liberal Democrat MSPs (all constituency members)
 3 Conservative MSPs (all additional members)

Constituency results
{| class=wikitable
!colspan=4 style=background-color:#f2f2f2|1999 Scottish Parliament election: North East Scotland
|-
! colspan=2 style="width: 200px"|Constituency
! style="width: 150px"|Elected member
! style="width: 300px"|Result
 
 
 
 
 
 
 
  
 
 

Changes:
 2001 Banff and Buchan by-election: Stewart Stevenson replaced Alex Salmond, who had resigned. Salmond was elected as the Member of Parliament for the Banff and Buchan constituency of the United Kingdom Parliament the same day as the Scottish Parliament by-election.

Additional member results
{| class=wikitable
!colspan=8 style=background-color:#f2f2f2|1999 Scottish Parliament election: North East Scotland
|-
! colspan="2" style="width: 150px"|Party
! Elected candidates
! style="width: 40px"|Seats
! style="width: 40px"|+/−
! style="width: 50px"|Votes
! style="width: 40px"|%
! style="width: 40px"|+/−%
|-

References

Politics of Aberdeen
Politics of Aberdeenshire
Politics of Angus, Scotland
Politics of Dundee
Politics of Moray
Scottish Parliamentary regions
Scottish Parliament constituencies and regions 1999–2011
Scottish Parliament constituencies and regions from 2011